A Woman's War (여성전선 - Yeoseon jeonseon) a.k.a. Women at the Front is a 1957 South Korean film directed by Kim Ki-young.

Synopsis

A melodrama about a housemaid who bears her employer's illegitimate daughter. The daughter visits her father on his deathbed, unable to tell him she is his daughter.

Cast
 Jo Mi-ryeong
 Park Am
 Lee Min
 Kim Dong-won
 Lee Hae-rang
 Joo Sun-tae
 Jeong Min
 Park Sang-ik
 Ko Seol-bong
 Choe Ryong

Notes

Bibliography
 
 
 

1957 films
1950s Korean-language films
Films directed by Kim Ki-young
South Korean drama films